Wilson–Miller Farm is a historic home and farm located near Sharpsburg, Washington County, Maryland, United States. The house is a two-story, two-part, eight-bay log building resting on fieldstone foundations.  The house features three brick chimneys, each painted red.  Outbuildings include a one-story stone springhouse and a frame bank barn.

It was listed on the National Register of Historic Places in 1980.

References

External links
, including photo in 1976, at Maryland Historical Trust

Farms on the National Register of Historic Places in Maryland
Houses in Washington County, Maryland
National Register of Historic Places in Washington County, Maryland